Jaye Davidson (born Alfred Amey; March 21, 1968) is an English model, fashion stylist, and retired actor. He made his acting debut as Dil in the thriller film The Crying Game (1992), for which he received an Academy Award nomination for Best Supporting Actor. Following his breakthrough, he portrayed the villainous Ra in the commercially successful science fiction film Stargate (1994). Davidson retired from acting afterwards, disliking the fame that the roles brought him.

Life
Davidson was born in Riverside, California, and was raised in Borehamwood in Hertfordshire, England. His father is from Ghana and his mother is from England.

Davidson is gay. During his acting career, he said that his androgynous look alienated him within the gay community. He stated that gay men "love very masculine men. And I'm not a very masculine person. I'm reasonably thin. I have long hair, which isn't very popular with gay men."

In 2017, he married Thomas Clarke.

Career
Davidson, who had no prior professional acting experience, was discovered at a wrap party for Derek Jarman's Edward II and was invited to audition for The Crying Game. He was cast in the role of Dil. The film was a critical and popular success. It is known for a surprise plot twist: a love scene in which Dil undresses and main character Fergus (played by Stephen Rea) discovers that Dil is transgender. The scene required full-frontal nudity. Rea later said, “If Jaye hadn’t been a completely convincing woman, my character would have looked stupid.” When the film was released, Miramax requested that reviewers keep Davidson's gender a secret.

For his work in The Crying Game, Davidson was nominated for the Academy Award for Best Supporting Actor and for the BAFTA Award for Best Actor in a Supporting Role in 1993. Davidson also received nominations for the Chicago Film Critics Association Award for Most Promising Actor and the Chicago Film Critics Association Award for Most Promising Actress in 1993.

Davidson starred as Ra, an alien impersonating a god, in the 1994 science fiction adventure film Stargate. He was surprised when they agreed to pay his $1 million fee.

Davidson later retired from acting, stating that he "genuinely hated the fame" he was receiving. He became more involved in modelling, and has since worked on several high-profile photo shoots, in addition to working as a fashion stylist in Paris.

Filmography

Film

Television

References

External links

1968 births
American male film actors
American expatriates in England
English male film actors
Living people
English gay actors
Male actors from Riverside, California
English male models
Male models from California
Gay models
People from Borehamwood
American emigrants to England
American gay actors
LGBT people from California
LGBT African Americans